Jean-Christophe Bouet (born 21 July 1983) is a French professional footballer who plays as a goalkeeper for FC Villefranche.

Career
Bouet spent most of his playing career in the Championnat National, the third division in France. After a successful season with USL Dunkerque in the Championnat,
Bouet at the age of 34 transferred to the Ligue 1 club Amiens SC on 20 July 2017.

Bouet made his professional debut at the age of 34 with Amiens in a 6–0 Coupe de France loss against FC Sochaux-Montbéliard on 7 January 2018. He was recalled in a 2–0 Coupe de la Ligue loss to Paris Saint-Germain on 10 January 2018, after the starting goalkeeper Régis Gurtner got a red card. He made his Ligue 1 debut in a 1–0 loss to OGC Nice on 13 January 2018.

In June 2018, Bouet signed a one-year deal with Laval, where he went on to play a full season as first-choice goalkeeper. For the 2019–20 season he returned to his first club Bayonne, a move which he claimed was "not a semi-retirement". In May 2020 he returned to the Championnat National with FC Villefranche. At the time of signing, the club refused to say whether he was second or third choice, but the subsequent departure of Alexis Sauvage to Laval handed Bouet the number one spot.

References

External links
 
 
 

1983 births
Living people
People from Dax, Landes
Sportspeople from Landes (department)
Association football goalkeepers
French footballers
Amiens SC players
USL Dunkerque players
Red Star F.C. players
Stade Lavallois players
Aviron Bayonnais players
FC Villefranche Beaujolais players
Ligue 1 players
Championnat National players
Championnat National 2 players
Championnat National 3 players
Footballers from Nouvelle-Aquitaine